John George Reitci (February 26, 1922 – April 25, 1983) was an American writer of detective fiction who wrote under the name Jack Ritchie. Although he wrote one novel, he was primarily known for his vast output of short stories.

Personal life

Early life
Jack Ritchie was born in a room behind his father's tailor shop in Milwaukee, Wisconsin on February 26, 1922. After leaving high school, Ritchie was a student at the Milwaukee State Teachers College. During the Second World War, he enlisted in the U.S. army and was stationed in the Central Pacific for two years, serving for much of that period on the island of Kwajalein. It was here that he first discovered crime and mystery fiction. To pass the time, he read a large amount of mystery books and it was through this that he grew to love the genre.

At the end of the war, Ritchie returned to his hometown of Milwaukee. After trying unsuccessfully to go back to college under the G.I. Bill, Ritchie worked for a time in his father's shop. Not wishing to pursue a tailor's career, Ritchie decided to try writing stories for a living. Ritchie's mother, Irma Reitci, also wrote short stories and she introduced him to a literary agent, Larry Sternig, to whom Jack gave a copy of a story he had just written. Sternig recognised Ritchie's writing ability at once and sold  the story, "Always the Season", to the New York Daily News in 1953.

Family
Ritchie married a fellow writer, Rita Krohne, in 1954. Rita, under her married name, wrote a series of historical adventure novels for children. Jack and Rita Ritchie made their living from the combined income of their freelance writing, though Jack Ritchie stated that they never collaborated on any of their stories.[1] Ritchie and his wife lived in various Milwaukee locales throughout the 1950s. Their first home together was a secluded log cabin on Washington Island. With the birth of their first child in 1957, the Ritchies relocated to a larger house on the island. In 1964, they moved back to the mainland, living in a farmhouse just west of Jefferson and raising a family of four children.[2]

While his wife took part-time work to supplement the family income, Jack dedicated himself to the writing of stories. Ritchie moved to Fort Atkinson, Wisconsin after he and his wife divorced in 1978.

Interests
Ritchie was an avid reader of non-fiction books and had a particular interest in history. He was also a fan of word puzzles and did the crossword in the Milwaukee Journal religiously.  When asked about influences on his work, Ritchie stated that he admired the writings of Agatha Christie, John D. MacDonald, Raymond Chandler, and Donald E. Westlake.

Death
Shortly after completing his only novel, Tiger Island, Jack Ritchie died of a heart attack at the Veterans Administration Hospital in Milwaukee. Ritchie was given a private, military funeral in Milwaukee on April 27, 1983.

Short stories
Jack Ritchie was a prolific writer of short stories, with his work appearing in an extraordinary variety of periodicals and newspapers.  He contributed a number of "hard-boiled" stories to Manhunt magazine throughout the 1950s with other stories appearing in such diverse publications as The Philadelphia Inquirer, Stag, New York Daily Mirror, Smashing Detective Stories, and Good Housekeeping. Ultimately, Ritchie published well over 500 stories.    The multiplicity of publications that purchased material from Ritchie can be explained by the fact that his lifelong agent, Larry Sternig, would promptly send out manuscripts whenever a new publication appeared on the scene.  However, it was to Alfred Hitchcock's Mystery Magazine that Ritchie sold more stories than any other periodical: 123 stories over a period of 23 years, 1959-1982. One of these tales, "The Green Heart", was adapted by director/star Elaine May into the cult movie classic A New Leaf co-starring Walter Matthau. "The Green Heart" was also adapted into a musical by Charles Busch and Rusty Magee. Other stories from AHMM were used in the popular television series Alfred Hitchcock Presents.  Nearly all of Ritchie's stories have been reprinted in periodicals and anthologies, with one story, "For All the Rude People", being re-published 12 times.

In the early 1970s, Ritchie created his two popular series characters, the vampire-sleuth Cardula, an anagram of Dracula, and Detective Henry Turnbuckle, both of whom went on to feature in some of Ritchie's best known stories. More television adaptations followed, with several stories serving as the basis for episodes of the show Tales of the Unexpected. One of Ritchie's stories, "The Absence of Emily", which won the Edgar Award in 1982, has been filmed twice.  Throughout the 1970s, Ritchie continued to contribute stories to various publications, most often to Ellery Queen's Mystery Magazine. Ritchie was also a lifelong member of the Council for Wisconsin Writers, from which he won three awards for his short fiction.

Ritchie's only novel, Tiger Island, was published in 1987, four years after his death, and other tales continued to be published posthumously, the most recent being "The Fabricator", which appeared in the May, 2009 issue of the Alfred Hitchcock Mystery Magazine.

Several prominent editors and authors in the mystery field who have praised Ritchie include Alfred Hitchcock, Donald E. Westlake, Anthony Boucher, Francis M. Nevins, Jr., and Edward D. Hoch.

References

External links 
 Jack Ritchie: An Appreciation and Bibliography

1922 births
1983 deaths
20th-century American novelists
American crime fiction writers
American male novelists
American mystery novelists
Edgar Award winners
Writers from Milwaukee
American male short story writers
20th-century American short story writers
20th-century American male writers
Novelists from Wisconsin
People from Fort Atkinson, Wisconsin